Coach Canada is the Canadian affiliate of Coach USA.

Charter services (rental of bus with driver) when originating in most areas in Ontario can travel to anywhere in North America. Megabus operations however are confined to the provinces of Quebec and Ontario, providing services under the Megabus brand in the main centres such as Toronto, Montreal, Kingston and Niagara Falls. Coach Canada is mainly a mix of scheduled services, charter operations and sightseeing tour operations. Coach Canada was included in the April 2019 disposal by Stagecoach of its North American operations to Variant Equity Advisors.

Operators
Approval under the Investment Canada Act was given to Stagecoach in October 1999, to acquire Erie Coach Lines of London, Autocar Connaisseur Inc., of Montréal and Trentway-Wagar of Peterborough, which became the core of their Canadian operations today.

Gray Line Montreal, although also owned by Stagecoach, is independently operated.

Scheduled bus services

Scheduled services (as Megabus):
 Toronto / Scarborough / Kingston / Brockville / Cornwall / Kirkland / Montreal
Toronto / Scarborough / Kingston  / Ottawa  
Toronto / Oakville / Grimsby / St. Catharines / Niagara Falls  
 Toronto Airport / Port Hope / Trenton / Belleville / Napanee / Kingston
Mississauga / Toronto Airport / Toronto-Yorkdale / Queen's University

Public transit operations
 Coach Canada no longer operates municipal transit. It previously held contracts with Durham Region Transit and Cobourg/Port Hope Transit, however those contracts were not renewed.

Carpool litigation
Trentway-Wagar won a legal battle in Ontario on November 12, 2008. The company had alleged that PickupPal, an online carpool matching service, was violating Ontario safety laws. PickupPal was ordered to pay $2,836.07 CAN to the Ontario government and $8,500.00 CAN to Trentway-Wagar for the violation of these laws.

Trentway-Wagar received criticism for its litigation against PickupPal, leading to cancellations by clients and prompting politicians to introduce new legislation that is more prepared to deal with emerging businesses like PickupPal.

On April 24, 2009 the Ontario Government amended the Public Vehicle Act to remove any mention of carpool vehicles, thus essentially removing any legal barriers preventing carpooling in Ontario.

See also
 Bus companies in Ontario

References

External links

Stagecoach Group bus operators in the United States and Canada
Companies based in Ontario
Intercity bus companies of Canada
Bus transport in Ontario
Bus transport in Quebec
Peterborough, Ontario
Transport companies established in 1999
Canadian companies established in 1999
1999 establishments in Ontario